James Murray (born May 5, 1995) is an American football center for the Jacksonville Jaguars of the National Football League (NFL). He played college football at Holy Cross.

College career
Murray began his football career at Holy Cross as a walk-on and redshirted his freshman season. He became a four-year starter for the Crusaders, appearing in 44 games and making 40 starts at three positions (center, left tackle, and right guard) on the offensive line. Murray was a second-team All-Patriot League selection during his junior and senior seasons.

Professional career

Kansas City Chiefs
Murray signed with the Kansas City Chiefs as an undrafted free agent on May 6, 2018. He failed to make the Chiefs' 53-man roster out of training camp but was subsequently signed to the team's practice squad on September 2, 2018. Murray was promoted to the Chiefs' active roster on October 23, 2018 to replace injured center Jordan Devey. Murray made his NFL debut on November 11, 2018 in a 26-14 win against the Arizona Cardinals.

Murray was waived by the Chiefs during final roster cuts on August 31, 2019, but was signed to the team's practice squad the next day. He was released on September 12.

Murray was drafted in the 8th round in phase two of the 2020 XFL Draft by the St. Louis BattleHawks, but did not sign with the league.

New York Jets
On November 6, 2019, Murray was signed to the New York Jets practice squad. He signed a reserve/future contract with the Jets on December 30, 2019.

On September 5, 2020, Murray was waived by the Jets and signed to the practice squad the next day. He was elevated to the active roster on September 26 for the team's week 3 game against the Indianapolis Colts, and reverted to the practice squad after the game. He was promoted to the active roster on October 10. He was waived on November 3 and re-signed to the practice squad two days later. He was signed to the active roster on November 28, 2020.

On August 31, 2021, Murray was waived by the Jets and re-signed to the practice squad the next day. He was released from the practice squad on October 7, 2021.

Tennessee Titans
On October 12, 2021, Murray was signed to the Tennessee Titans practice squad. He was released on October 26, 2021.

Baltimore Ravens
On December 22, 2021, Murray was signed to the Baltimore Ravens practice squad. He signed a reserve/future contract with the Ravens on January 10, 2022. He was waived on August 29, 2022.

Jacksonville Jaguars
On September 12, 2022, Murray signed with the practice squad of the Jacksonville Jaguars. He signed a reserve/future contract on January 23, 2023.

References

External links
Holy Cross Crusaders bio
Kansas City Chiefs bio

1995 births
Living people
People from Wilmette, Illinois
Players of American football from Illinois
Sportspeople from Cook County, Illinois
American football centers
Holy Cross Crusaders football players
Kansas City Chiefs players
New York Jets players
Tennessee Titans players
Baltimore Ravens players
Jacksonville Jaguars players